Menrva is the largest crater on Titan, with a diameter of 392 kilometers. The crater is a heavily eroded double ringed impact basin, similar to the impact related features of Mars and Mercury. This is evident by Menrva's distinct lack of a central peak, indicating modification of the crater's surface since formation. It has been estimated that Menrva is approximately 2.8 kilometers deep.

A network of channels known as Elivagar Flumina flow away from the crest of the crater into a catchment basin.

The feature is named after the goddess of wisdom in Etruscan mythology, Menrva.

References 

Impact craters on Saturn's moons
Surface features of Titan (moon)